is a former Japanese football player.

Playing career
Hikaru Fujishima played for Grulla Morioka and Vanraure Hachinohe from 2012 to 2015.

References

External links

1989 births
Living people
Nippon Sport Science University alumni
Association football people from Iwate Prefecture
Japanese footballers
J3 League players
Japan Football League players
Iwate Grulla Morioka players
Vanraure Hachinohe players
Association football defenders